Harold Tate may refer to:

Harold Theodore Tate, Treasurer of the United States, 1928–1929
 Harold Tate (priest), Archdeacon of Bombay, 1948–1950
Harold Tate, a character in the film Stony Island

See also
Harry Tate (disambiguation)